Atlanta was a casemate ironclad that served in the Confederate and Union Navies during the American Civil War. She was converted from a British-built blockade runner named Fingal by the Confederacy after she made one run to Savannah, Georgia. After several failed attempts to attack Union blockaders, the ship was captured by two Union monitors in 1863 when she ran aground. Atlanta was floated off, repaired, and rearmed, serving in the Union Navy for the rest of the war. She spent most of her time deployed on the James River supporting Union forces there. The ship was decommissioned in 1865 and placed in reserve. Several years after the end of the war, Atlanta was sold to Haiti, but was lost at sea in December 1869 on her delivery voyage.

Description and career as Fingal
Fingal was designed and built as a merchantman by J&G Thomson's Clyde Bank Iron Shipyard at Govan in Glasgow, Scotland, and was completed early in 1861. He estimated her tonnage at around 700 tons bm. Fingal was equipped with two vertical single-cylinder direct-acting steam engines using steam generated by one flue-tubular boiler.

The ship briefly operated between Glasgow and other ports in Scotland for Hutcheson's West Highland Service before she was purchased in September 1861 by James D. Bulloch, the primary foreign agent in Great Britain for the Confederacy, and Major Edward Clifford Anderson Confederate Secretary of War in England, to deliver the military and naval ordnance and supplies that they purchased. To disguise his control of Fingal, and the destination of her cargo, Bulloch hired an English crew and captain and put out his destination as Bermuda and Nassau in the Bahamas. The cargo was loaded in Greenock in early October, although Bulloch and the other passengers would not attempt to board until they rendezvoused with the ship at Holyhead, Wales. On the night 14/15 October, as she was slowly rounding the breakwater at Holyhead, Fingal rammed and sank the Austrian brig Siccardi, slowly swinging at anchor without lights. Bulloch and the passengers embarked in the steamer while Bulloch dispatched a letter to his financial agents instructing them to settle damages with the brig's owners because he could not afford to take the time to deal with the affair lest he and Fingal be detained. The ship reached Bermuda on 2 November and, after leaving port on 7 November, Bulloch informed the crew that the steamer's real destination was Savannah, Georgia; he offered to take anyone who objected to the plan to Nassau. However, all of the crew agreed to join in the effort to run the Union blockade. Fingal was able to slip safely into the Savannah estuary in a heavy fog on the night of 12 November without sighting any blockaders.

While Fingal was discharging her cargo, Bulloch and Anderson went to Richmond to confer with Stephen Mallory, Secretary of the Navy. Mallory endorsed Bulloch's plan to load Fingal with cotton to sell on the Navy Department's account to be used to purchase more ships and equipment in Europe. He returned to Savannah on 23 November and it took him almost a month to purchase a cargo and acquire enough coal. He made one attempt to break through the blockade on 23 December, but it proved impossible to do as the Union controlled every channel from Savannah, aided by their occupation of Tybee Island at the mouth of the Savannah River. Bulloch reported to Mallory in late January 1862 that breaking out was hopeless so Mallory ordered him to turn the ship over to another officer and to return to Europe some other way.

As Atlanta

The brothers Asa and Nelson Tift received the contract to convert the blockade runner into an ironclad in early 1862 with the name of Atlanta, after the city in Georgia. This was largely financed by contributions from the women of Savannah. Fingal was cut down to her main deck and large wooden sponsons were built out from the sides of her hull to support her casemate.

The outer layer ran vertically and the inner layer horizontally. The pyramidal pilothouse was armored in the same way and had room for two men. The upper portion of Atlantas hull received  of armor.

The rectangular casemate was pierced with eight narrow gun ports, one each at the bow and stern and three along each side. Each gun port was protected by an armored shutter made of two layers of iron riveted together and allowed the guns to elevate only to a maximum of +5 to +7°. Atlanta was armed with single-banded,  Brooke rifles on pivot mounts at the bow and stern. The middle gun port on each side was occupied by a single-banded,  Brooke rifle. In front of the ram was a spar torpedo that carried  of black powder on a wooden pole connected to an iron lever that could be raised or lowered by means of pulleys.

On 31 July 1862, under the command of Lieutenant Charles H. McBlair, Atlanta conducted her sea trials down the Savannah River toward Fort Pulaski. The ship proved to be difficult to steer, and the additional weight of her armor and guns significantly reduced her speed and increased her draft. This latter was a real problem in the shallow waters near Savannah. She also leaked significantly, and her design virtually eliminated air circulation. One report said that "it was almost intolerable on board the Atlanta, there being no method of ventilation, and the heat was intense." Scales commented in his diary, "What a comfortless, infernal and God-forsaken ship!!" 
 
Attempts were made to fix the problems and were at least partially successful in stopping many of the leaks.
The ship was commissioned on 22 November and became the flagship of Flag Officer Josiah Tattnall III, commander of the naval defenses of Georgia. Under pressure from Mallory to engage the blockading ships, Tattnall attempted to engage them before any ironclads arrived on 5 January 1863, but army engineers could not clear the obstacles blocking the channel in a timely manner, despite early coordination being made by Tattnall to do so. It took another month to actually clear the obstacles and two monitors arrived before the end of January. Nonetheless Tattnall attempted to pass through the obstructions during high tide on 3 February, but high winds prevented the water from rising enough to allow the ship to do so. After Atlanta successfully passed through them on 19 March, Tattnall planned to attack the Union base at Port Royal, South Carolina while the monitors were attacking Charleston. Deserters revealed Tatnall's plan while he was waiting at the head of Wassaw Sound and he was forced to retreat when three monitors augmented the defenses at Port Royal. Dissatisfied with Tattnall's perceived lack of aggressiveness, Mallory replaced Tattnall as commander of the Savannah squadron later that month with Commander Richard L. Page. Page, in his turn was relieved in May by Commander William A. Webb; Atlanta remained the squadron flagship throughout this time.

Webb demonstrated his aggressiveness when he attempted to sortie on the first spring tide (30 May) after taking command, but Atlantas forward engine broke down after he had passed the obstructions, and the ship ran aground. She was not damaged although it took over a day to pull her free. He planned to make another attempt on the next full tide, rejecting Mallory's idea that he wait until the nearly complete ironclad Savannah was finished before his next sortie. In the meantime, Rear Admiral Samuel F. Du Pont, commander of the South Atlantic Blockading Squadron, had ordered the monitors Weehawken and Nahant into Wassaw Sound. Commander John Rodgers in Weehawken had overall command of the two ships.

In the early evening of 15 June, Webb began his next attempt by passing over the lower obstructions in the Wilmington River and spent the rest of the night coaling. He moved forward the next evening to a concealed position within easy reach of the monitors for an attack early the following morning. Webb planned to sink one of the monitors with his spar torpedo and then deal with the other one with his guns. The gunboat Isondiga and the tugboat Resolute were to accompany him to tow one or both of the monitors back to Savannah.

A lookout aboard Weehawken spotted Atlanta at 04:10 on the morning of 17 June. Shortly afterward, Atlanta ran aground on a sandbar; she was briefly able to free herself, but the pressure of the tide pushed her back onto the sandbar. This time Webb was unable to get off and the monitors closed the range. When Weehawken, the leading ship, closed to within  she opened fire with both of her guns. The  shell missed, but the  shell struck the ironclad above the port middle gun port, penetrated her armor and broke the wooden backing behind it, spraying splinters and fragments that disabled the entire gun crew and half the crew of the bow gun, even though it failed to cleanly penetrate through the backing. The next shot from the 11-inch Dahlgren gun struck the upper hull and started a small leak even though it failed to penetrate the two-inch armor there. The next shell from the 15-inch Dahlgren glanced off the middle starboard gun shutter as it was being opened, wounding half the gun's crew with fragments. The final shell was also from the 15-inch Dahlgren and it struck the top of the pilothouse, breaking the armor there and wounding both pilots in it. By this time, Atlanta had been able to fire only seven shots, none of which hit either Union ship, and was hard aground with high tide not due for another hour and a half. Weehawken and Nahant were able to freely maneuver into positions from which the Atlantas narrow gun ports would not allow her to reply and the damage already inflicted by the former ship made further resistance futile. Webb surrendered his ship within 15 minutes of opening fire, before Nahant even had a chance to fire. Of the ironclad's 21 officers and 124 enlisted men, one man was killed and another sixteen were wounded badly enough to require hospitalization.

In the Union Navy

Atlanta was easily pulled free by the Union ships and she reached Port Royal under her own power. Not badly damaged, she was repaired and bought by the Union Navy. The prize money of $350,000 was shared between the crews of Weehawken, Nahant and the gunboat , the only ships within signaling distance. All four of her Brooke rifles are currently located in Willard Park in the Washington Navy Yard. Atlanta was assigned to the North Atlantic Blockading Squadron and spent most of her time stationed up the James River where she could support operations against Richmond and defend against a sortie by the ironclads of the James River Squadron. On 21 May 1864, she and the gunboat  fired on and dispersed Confederate cavalry that was attacking Fort Powhatan and she was deployed further upriver in February 1865 after the Battle of Trent's Reach to better blockade the Confederate ironclads at Richmond.

After the end of the war in April, Atlanta was decommissioned in Philadelphia on 21 June 1865 and placed in reserve at League Island. She was sold to Sam Ward on 4 May 1869 for the price of $25,000 and subsequently delivered to representatives of Haiti on 8 December by Sydney Oaksmith, a lawyer who had received an advance of $50,000 on her purchase price of $260,000. The ship was briefly seized by the Customs Service, possibly for violations of neutrality laws as she had just loaded four large guns and a number of recruits for the forces of Sylvain Salnave, President of Haiti, who was embroiled in a civil war. Atlanta was released and sailed for Port-au-Prince three days later. She broke down in Delaware Bay and had to put in at Chester, Pennsylvania for repairs. The ship, now renamed either Triumph or Triumfo, departed on 18 December 1869 and vanished en route, apparently sinking with the loss of all hands, either off Cape Hatteras or the Delaware Capes.

See also

 Blockade runners of the American Civil War
Bibliography of American Civil War naval history

References

Bibliography 
Anderson, Edward Clifford, Afloat and Ashore: The Confederate Diary of Colonel Edward Clifford Anderson, University of Alabama Press, 1977

Further reading
Bibliography of Civil War naval history

External links

Various photos and drawings of Atlanta
List of prisoners from the CSS Atlanta on June 17, 1863
"Rebel Ram 'Atlanta'" at the Historical Society of Pennsylvania

Steamships of the United States Navy
Ironclad warships of the Union Navy
Ironclad warships of the Confederate States Navy
Shipwrecks of the Carolina coast
Georgia (U.S. state) in the American Civil War
Ships built on the River Clyde
1861 ships
Maritime incidents in June 1863
Maritime incidents in December 1869
Vessels captured by the United States Navy
Blockade runners of the American Civil War
Ships transferred from the United States Navy to the Haitian Navy